The Nelson Thomlinson School is a comprehensive secondary school located in the market town of Wigton, Cumbria, England. The school's motto is the Latin phrase Fide et Operis, "Faith and Works". The position of Headteacher has been occupied by David Samuel Northwood since September 2011, after the former head, Janet Downes, retired at the end of the previous academic year.

Students
As with many older British Secondary schools, The Nelson Thomlinson School has a prefect system drawn from the Sixth Form. However, instead of one Head Prefect or a Head Boy & Girl pair, there are five Head Prefects who each take charge on a particular day of the week. Former pupils of the school include TV presenter Melvyn Bragg and BBC newsreader Anna Ford.

There were approximately 1400 pupils aged 11–18 attending Nelson Thomlinson as of the 2014-15 academic year.

Catchment area 
Most pupils at Nelson Thomlinson are from Wigton and the smaller communities within a few miles of the town which fall within its catchment area. However, some pupils come from further afield, including smaller settlements like Allonby, Bowness-on-Solway, Hesket Newmarket, and Mawbray, and also from larger towns such as  Aspatria, Maryport, Silloth, and the city of Carlisle, which all have their own secondary schools. Prices for the 2014-15 academic year on a bus from Carlisle to Nelson Thomlinson we £16.50 per week, and from Dalston the price was £13.50 per week.

The Sixth Form
Since 1997 their results have placed them in the top fifty comprehensive school Sixth Forms in the country and 5 times have been in the top 10.

Achievements
The school enters students in the GCSE and A-Level examinations. Around 70% of pupils achieve 5 or more A*-Cs each year in GCSE examinations, and in terms of A-Level results, the school has been rated in the country's top 40 comprehensive school since 1997 . In a 2006 Ofsted inspection the school was judged to be an Outstanding school. In the most recent Ofsted inspection, May 2013 the school was deemed outstanding

Productions
In 2016 the school organized its own production of Charles Dickens "Oliver Twist", directed by drama teacher Mrs. R. Carroll. The play included a full cast and a small orchestra (Musical Director: Ms. R. Raven).

Young Enterprise
The school's Young Enterprise teams have performed well in the Young Enterprise competition over the past few years.

In 2003/04, the company "Panacea" won the Young Enterprise Carlisle Area Board prize for the first time in the school's history. Their awards included Carlisle Area Board Champions 2004, Best Trade Stand at the Easter Trade Fair, Best Company Report, Best Presentation, and First Place at the Exhibition Evening. A Panacea company member, Adam Scott, also won the Individual Achiever of the Year award. The team's gross revenue was £1610.58, which was the highest gained by all known competitors that year.

Panacea then progressed to the Cumbria County Finals in Kendal, but did not progress to the next round.

In the 2006/2007 academic year, the Young Enterprise team "Eläin" won three awards in the North Cumbria round: "Best Company Report", "Best Trade Stand", and "Best Overall Company" as well as second place for "Best Company Presentation".  In the county round, the team won "Best Company Presentation", the "ICSA Good Governance Award", and won third place for "Best Trade Stand". The team came second for "Best Overall Company" in Cumbria. Eläin focused primarily on personalised goods for families and pets and was the largest team the school has yet entered into the competition, with eighteen members.

In the 2007/2008 academic year, NTS entered "Bagcycle" as the Young Enterprise entry. The team won first place at the December trade fair, and second place at the Cumbria Area award ceremony.

The Young Enterprise team for the 2008-2009 school year was Veg-Eco, the team performed well at the regional finals.

In the 2012/2013 academic year, NTS entered "KickStart" as the Young Enterprise entry.  The team reached the North West finals, which took place at the Concorde Conference Centre in Manchester Airport.

The School's most successful NTS Young Enterprise to date is Digi-Pi, which was set up during the 2013/2014 academic year. This team of 10 progressed through three rounds to get to the National Finals, in which they achieved third place- a record for the school and for the county.

History
The Thomlinson Girls School (formed from Westmorland House owned by Isaac Pattinson and named after the cotton manufacturer John Thomlinson, and now known as the Thomlinson Junior School on The Goose Market) and The Nelson School for Boys (formed from Floshfirld House), which were both grammar schools and had opened in 1899, merged in 1953 to form the Nelson Thomlinson Grammar School. This school merged with Wigton Secondary School (a secondary modern school) in 1969 to form the Nelson Thomlinson Comprehensive School.

Controversies 
In 2004, anti-social behaviour in the town centre by under-18s, many of whom were pupils at Nelson Thominson School, prompted authorities to impose a curfew on youths in Wigton. The curfew ran through the 2004 Easter holidays and prohibited any unaccompanied children under the age of 16 from being out on the streets between 21:00 and 06:00. During the curfew, instances of anti-social behaviour, such as intimidation and broken shop windows, dropped by as much as 75%. However, the curfew was not repeated after 2004.

In 2014, Hayley Southwell, a teacher at Nelson Thomlinson, was arrested and pleaded guilty to charges of having sexual activity with a girl aged between 16 and 18 while in a position of trust. Her victim was a pupil at the school, and the crimes took place between May 2013 and January 2014. She was handed a 12-month suspended prison sentence and had to sign the sex offenders register for a period of ten years. During sentencing, the judge said that Southwell's relationship with her victim showed "a degree of grooming".

Headteachers 
 Peter M. Ireland (1988-2007)
 Janet Downes (2007-2012)
 David S. Northwood (2012–Present)

The Professional Development Room/Department
Arising from a successful bid for Mathematics and Computing College Status, the school has included a room specifically designed for lesson observation. It might look like an ordinary classroom; the only apparently unusual feature is a large mirror set into one of the walls. What appears to be a mirror, however, is actually a piece of one-way glass, Behind the glass is an observation booth, from which a teacher, or group of teachers, can observe the lesson and quietly discuss what is happening.

Notable former pupils

 Melvyn Bragg - British broadcaster.
 Sheila Fell - Artist
 Anna Ford - British newsreader.
 Thomas Holliday - Rugby union and rugby league footballer of the 1920s
 Sir John Jones - Director General of MI5
 Helen Housby - Current England Netball Player.
 Jarrad Branthwaite - Everton footballer

External links
 The Nelson Thomlinson School website

References

Secondary schools in Cumbria
Voluntary controlled schools in England
Wigton